Jeon Jae-won (born 21 November 1973) is a South Korean biathlete. He competed in the men's 20 km individual event at the 1998 Winter Olympics.

References

1973 births
Living people
South Korean male biathletes
Olympic biathletes of South Korea
Biathletes at the 1998 Winter Olympics
Sportspeople from Gangwon Province, South Korea
Asian Games medalists in biathlon
Biathletes at the 1999 Asian Winter Games
Asian Games bronze medalists for South Korea
Medalists at the 1999 Asian Winter Games
20th-century South Korean people
21st-century South Korean people